Nationality words link to articles with information on the nation's poetry or literature (for instance, Irish or France).

Events
 This year in England, John Phillips, a nephew of John Milton, is summoned before the privy council for his share in a book of licentious poems, Sportive Wit, suppressed by the authorities but almost immediately replaced by a similar collection, Wit and Drollery.
 Hallgrímur Pétursson begins work on his Passion Hymns

Works published
 Margaret Cavendish, Lady Newcastle, Natures Pictures Drawn by Fancies Pencil to the Life, fiction, poetry and prose
 Abraham Cowley:
 Miscellanies, including "On the Death of Mr. Crashaw"
 Poems
 Pindaric Odes
 Sir John Denham, translator, The Destruction of Troy, published anonymously, partial translation of Virgil's Aeneid, Book 2
 William Davenant, Wit and Drollery: Jovial Poems
 William Drummond, Poems
 John Evelyn, translator, An Essay on the First Book of T. Lucretius Carus, translation of the Latin of Lucretius' De rerum natura, with both English and Latin; including commendatory poems by Sir Richard Brown, Edmund Waller and Christopher Wase (in Latin); this work was the first attempt to translate the work into English; Evelyn translated only the first book after realizing that he didn't have the ability to write a translation, as he put it, "to equal the elegancy of the original", although some of his friends warned him of the danger of the atheistic work to his morals, spirituality and reputation
 Richard Flecknoe, The Diarium, or Journall, anonymously published
 Mary Oxlie, authored a commendatory poem of fifty-two lines, To William Drummond of Hawthornden

Births
Death years link to the corresponding "[year] in poetry" article:
 Lady Mary Chudleigh (died 1710), English poet and essayist
 Henry Hall (died 1707), English poet and composer

Deaths
Birth years link to the corresponding "[year] in poetry" article:
 Joseph Hall (born 1574), English bishop, satirist, moralist, and poet
 Johan van Heemskerk (born 1597), Dutch poet
 Johann Klaj (born 1616), German poet

See also

 Poetry
 17th century in poetry
 17th century in literature

Notes

17th-century poetry
Poetry